Cherie Mercado-Santos is a Filipina broadcast journalist in the Philippines.

Cherie is married to Mike Santos, a stockbroker, and they have two children, Christiana and Anabella.

Career
With 24 years of experience as a writer, reporter, producer, host and anchor, Cherie worked for the top three networks in the Philippines beginning her careers a news reporter and researcher at GMA Broadcasting Corp., then as one of the best live on-the-scene reporters for ABS-CBN News, before finally signing with TV5.

Prior to joining TV5, she hosted ABS-CBN's Morning Show “Alas Singko Y’Medya”, “Magandang Umaga Bayan”, The Global News and her own lifestyleshow on ANC, Coffee Talk with Cherie Mercado.

As a senior newscaster, she is a prominent figure in the news industry and well-respected for her poise, professionalism, great sense of style and hard-hitting news stories including her coverage of the Mindanao conflict.

She was chosen by Sky News Broadcasting in London to speak about the Philippines’ coverage of the Royal Wedding.

She was the solo host and anchor for CNN Konek, a local franchise of CNN Connect the World hosted by CNN's senior anchor Becky Anderson. It aired on AksyonTV every weeknight at 7:30-8:00pm.

She was also co-hosts a radio program with news personality Paolo Bediones entitled “Trabaho Lang with Paolo and Cherie”, which airs every weeknight on Radyo5, 92.3 News FM from 8:00-9:30pm.

She was the co-anchor of late-night newscast entitled Aksyon JournalisMO together with Jove Francisco and Martin Andanar.

She was also the co-anchor of the late newscast entitled Pilipinas News, replaced Aksyon JournalisMO, together with Jove Francisco and Paolo Bediones.

On July 21, 2014, Mercado was moved to noontime newscast Aksyon sa Tanghali together with Raffy Tulfo.

On July 15, 2016, Mercado left TV5, her home network for 12 years to become the spokesperson of the Department of Transportation (DOTR). Mercado later resigned in May 2017 due to her motherhood.

On February 12, 2018, Mercado joined CNN Philippines, as she takes over as a new anchor of the Evening Edition of Newsroom replaced Mitzi Borromeo.

On September 3, 2018, Mercado moved to Mid-morning Filipino newscast Newsroom Ngayon.

Filmography

Television

Radio
 Trabaho Lang! (2013–2014; 2015–2016) - Radyo5 92.3 News FM

References 

1972 births
Living people
Filipino television news anchors
Filipino radio journalists
People from Bulacan
ABS-CBN personalities
ABS-CBN News and Current Affairs people
TV5 (Philippine TV network) personalities
News5 people
CNN people
Duterte administration personnel
Filipino women journalists
Women radio journalists